Sergey Ogureshnikov (born April 4, 1977 in Oskemen) is a Kazakhstani ice hockey goaltender currently playing for Kazzinc-Torpedo. He was a member of the Kazakhstan men's national ice hockey team at the 2001 and 2005 World Ice Hockey Championships.

References

Living people
1977 births
Kazakhstani ice hockey players
Sportspeople from Oskemen
Asian Games gold medalists for Kazakhstan
Asian Games silver medalists for Kazakhstan
Medalists at the 1999 Asian Winter Games
Medalists at the 2007 Asian Winter Games
Ice hockey players at the 1999 Asian Winter Games
Ice hockey players at the 2007 Asian Winter Games
Asian Games medalists in ice hockey